Ira Joy Chase (December 7, 1834May 11, 1895) was a veteran of the American Civil War, a leading member of the Grand Army of the Republic, a prominent Church of Christ evangelist, and the 22nd governor of Indiana between November 23, 1891, and January 9, 1893.

Early life
Ira Joy Chase was born in 1834 in New York, the son of Benjamin and Lordina Mix Chase. His parents were poor, and spent much of his early life moving from place to place. He was educated at Medina Academy where he received a common education, and then attended the Milan Seminary to be trained as a minister. In 1855 his family moved to Barrington, Illinois. There he and his father took a job driving wagon teams in the Chicago stockyards. He soon found work as a teacher, where he met Rhoda Jane Castle. He married her and had three children before he joined the Union army at the start of the American Civil War. His health was frequently poor during the war, so he was removed from front-line duty and served as a drill instructor to prepare and train new recruits. His health still worsened and he was forced to spend several months in a military hospital. His wife heard of his situation and left their Illinois home to be with him in Tennessee. She was not permitted to remain in the hospital because she was a civilian, so she joined the army as a nurse.  As his health recovered, he returned to duty as a  chaplain.

The day after they left to return home in 1864, she contracted smallpox. Chase spent several weeks nursing her back to health, but the virus left her blind and crippled. Chase opened a hardware store to try to support his family, but the community avoided contact with him for weeks after his wife's smallpox had gone; the lack of customers forced him to close the store. He began preaching in local churches, and gained popularity in the community for his sermons against liquor. In 1867 he moved to Indiana to become the minister of the Christian Church of Mishawaka, Indiana. He also pastored in churches in La Porte, Wabash, and Danville.

Chase was one of the founding members of the Grand Army of the Republic. He became chaplain of the Indiana G.A.R. in 1886 and was elected as the department head in 1887, and served for several years in that position. The group was heavily involved in political lobbying, primarily to secure benefits for veterans of the Civil War. His high standing in the organization gained him clout in political circles because of his ability influence members' votes.

Political career

Because of his influence in the Indiana G.A.R., he was elected the 20th Lieutenant Governor of Indiana on January 14, 1889, and served until the death of Governor Alvin Peterson Hovey. He was criticized by the Methodists and other large denominations for continuing to serve as a minister during his tenure primarily because of their dislike for the Church of Christ. He was sworn in as governor on  November 23, 1891, and served until January 9, 1893. His administration oversaw the expansion of the state's road system and the construction of the state's Soldiers' and Saliors' monument. He also returned the state to the temperance debate, urging prohibition laws to be enacted. His position on temperance was controversial within his own party. Republicans feared losing support to Democrats could cost the party on the national ticket. He had also oppose several work reform laws, and was perceived by many to be anti-labor.

He was nominated by his party to run for governor in 1892 for a full term of his own, and he accepted. Party leaders had attempted to deny him the chance because of his labor and temperance positions by holding the state convention as far as possible from his base of support and during harvest time in hopes that few farmers would attend, but the attempt failed. He delivered speeches at his many campaign stops where he would also preach a sermon later in the day at one of the area churches. His sermons were often firebrand and prohibitionist. Some of the doctrines he taught caused Methodist and Presbyterian churches, the two largest churches in the state, to urge their members to vote against him. He was defeated at the polls by Democrat Claude Matthews who won by plurality, with Populist Party candidate Leroy Templeton capturing nearly five percent of the vote which would have ordinarily gone to the Republican party.

Chase returned to private life and continued preaching. He became even more prominent as a minister following his term as governor and began traveling nationally to deliver sermons. He died in 1895 in Lubec, Maine, after delivering a sermon. His remains were returned to be buried in the Crown Hill Cemetery in Indianapolis, Indiana.

Electoral history

See also

List of governors of Indiana

References
Notes

Bibliography

External links
Indiana Historical Bureau: Biography and portrait
National Governors Association
Ira Chase at FindAGrave

1834 births
1895 deaths
American Presbyterians
Burials at Crown Hill Cemetery
Republican Party governors of Indiana
Ministers of the Churches of Christ
19th-century American politicians
Grand Army of the Republic officials